General elections were held in Grenada on 19 February 2013. The result was a landslide victory for the opposition New National Party, which won all 15 seats.

Date
The election date was announced by Prime Minister Tillman Thomas at the National Democratic Congress Party Convention at Sauteurs Bus Station on 13 January 2013.

Electoral system
The fifteen members of the House of Representatives were elected in single-member constituencies by first-past-the-post voting.

Candidates

Conduct
The preliminary report from invited Organisation of American States election observers was positive regarding the "civil and peaceful" election and its high turnout. The observers noted minor bureaucratic problems, and recommended greater enactment of campaign finance regulations. The observers also noted that women were under-represented in the list of candidates (9 of 48) and elected representatives (4 of 15).

Results

References

Elections in Grenada
Grenada
General
Grenada
Landslide victories